This article lists the squads for the 2022 Algarve Cup, the 28th edition of the Algarve Cup. The cup consisted of a series of friendly games, and was held in the Algarve region of Portugal from 16 to 23 February 2022. The five national teams involved in the tournament registered a squad of 23 players.

The age listed for each player is as of 16 February 2022, the first day of the tournament. The numbers of caps and goals listed for each player do not include any matches played after the start of tournament. The club listed is the club for which the player last played a competitive match prior to the tournament. The nationality for each club reflects the national association (not the league) to which the club is affiliated. A flag is included for coaches that are of a different nationality than their own national team.

Squads

Denmark
Coach: Lars Søndergaard

The 23-player squad was announced on 7 February 2022. On 11 February 2022, Rikke Sevecke withdrew due to injury and was replaced by Isabella Bryld Obaze.

Italy
Coach: Milena Bertolini

The 25-player squad was announced on 9 February 2022.

Norway
Coach:  Martin Sjögren

The 24-player squad was announced on 8 February 2022. A week later, it was announced that Caroline Graham Hansen had not travelled with the squad due to an ankle sprain, and a few days after that she withdrew from the squad.

Portugal
Coach: Francisco Neto

The 23-player squad was announced on 7 February 2022. A week later, Andreia Jacinto withdrew due to injury and was replaced by Joana Martins.

Sweden
Coach: Peter Gerhardsson

The 25-player squad was announced on 8 February 2022, with Linda Sembrant named as a reserve player.

Player representation

By club
Clubs with 3 or more players represented are listed.

By club nationality

By club federation

By representatives of domestic league

References

2022 squads
squad